{{DISPLAYTITLE:C10H10O2}}
The molecular formula C10H10O2 (molar mass : 162.18 g/mol) may refer to:

 Benzoylacetone
 Isosafrole, 3,4-methylenedioxyphenyl-1-propene
 4-Methoxycinnamaldehyde
 Methyl cinnamate
 Safrole, 3,4-methylenedioxyphenyl-2-propene
 4,5-Dihydro-1-benzoxepin-3(2H)-one, a watermelon flavorant